Aerojet Rocketdyne Holdings, Inc. is a holding company of Aerojet Rocketdyne, an American manufacturer of rocket, hypersonic, and electric propulsive systems for space, defense, civil and commercial applications. Aerojet traces its origins to the General Tire and Rubber Company established in 1915, while Rocketdyne was created as a division of North American Aviation in 1955.

In addition to Aerojet Rocketdyne, the holding company also owns the real estate firm Easton Development Company, LLC through which it owns over 12,000 acres of land near Sacramento, California originally utilized for Aerojet's operations in testing and manufacturing dating back to the 1950s, however due to the evolution of the firm and propulsion technology, about half of this land is now being redeveloped for residential and commercial use by the company.

History

Background: Aerojet

Several decades after it began manufacturing rubber products, General Tire & Rubber diversified into broadcasting and aeronautics.

In the 1940s, the Aerojet company began experimenting with various rocket designs. For a solid-fuel rocket, they needed binders, and turned to General Rubber for assistance. General became a partner in the company.

Radio broadcasting began with the purchase of several radio networks starting in 1943. In 1952, its purchase of WOR-TV expanded the broadcast business into television. In 1953, General Tire & Rubber bought the RKO Radio Pictures movie studio. All of its media and entertainment holdings were organized into the RKO General division.

Due to the studio and rocket businesses, General Tire & Rubber came to own a great deal of property in California. Its internal facilities management unit began commercializing its operations, landing General Tire & Rubber in the real estate business. Aerojet converted these former gold fields into one of the premier rocket manufacturing and testing facilities in the Western world. However, most of this land was used to provide safe buffer zones for Aerojet's testing and manufacturing operations. Later, as the need for these facilities and safety zones decreased, the property became available for other uses. Approximately  of the Aerojet lands are now being planned as a community called Easton. Easton Development Company LLC was formed to assist in the process.

Background: Rocketdyne

In 1955, North American Aviation spun off Rocketdyne, a developer of rocket motors that built upon research conducted into the German V-2 Rocket after World War II. Rocketdyne would become a major supplier for NASA, producing the Rocketdyne F-1 engine for the Saturn V rocket of the Apollo Space Program as well as the RS-25 engine of the Space Shuttle program and its successor the Space Launch System (SLS) program. Together, Aerojet Rocketdyne has gone on to contribute to every successful NASA Mars mission, including powering the launch, entry, descent, and landing phases of the Perseverance rover mission.

Name change

In 1984, General Tire created a parent holding company, GenCorp, for its various businesses.  The main subsidiaries were:
General Tire and Rubber;
RKO General, the broadcast arm of the conglomerate;
DiversiTech General, a manufacturer of tennis balls and polymer products, including automotive soundproofing and home wallpapers; and
Aerojet General, a defense (missile) contractor.

Through its RKO General subsidiary, the company also held stakes in:
Frontier Airlines;
RKO bottlers, which operated Pepsi-Cola distributorships; and
several resorts and hotels, including the Westward Look resort in Tucson, Arizona.

Disconglomeration
Faced with a hostile takeover attempt, among other difficulties, GenCorp shed some of its long-held units in the late 1980s.

RKO General ran into difficulties with the Federal Communications Commission (FCC) during license renewal proceedings in the late 1980s. The FCC was reluctant to renew the broadcast licenses, due to widespread lying to advertisers and regulators. As a result of the protracted proceedings, GenCorp sold RKO General's broadcast properties beginning in 1987.

GenCorp also sold its former flagship, General Tire, to German tire maker Continental AG in order to concentrate on Aerojet.

In 1999, GenCorp spun off its Decorative & Building Products and Performance Chemicals businesses. GenCorp formed OMNOVA Solutions, Inc. into a separate, publicly traded company, and transferred those businesses into it.

GenCorp's two remaining businesses, as of 2008, are Aerojet and real estate.

Aeronautics expansion
In July 2012, GenCorp agreed to buy rocket engine producer Pratt & Whitney Rocketdyne from United Technologies Corporation for $550 million. The FTC approved the deal on June 10, 2013, and it closed on June 17.

Abandoned acquisition by Lockheed Martin
On December 20, 2020, it was announced that Lockheed Martin would acquire the company for $4.4 billion. The acquisition was expected to close in first quarter of 2022, however this received opposition from Raytheon Technologies, later the FTC sued to block this deal on a 4-0 vote in January 2022 on grounds that this would eliminate the largest independent maker of rocket motors and Lockheed subsequently abandoned the deal in February 2022.

Acquisition by L3Harris
In December 2022, L3Harris Technologies agreed to buy the company for $4.7 billion in cash.

Pension and bond problems

GenCorp withdrew its over-funded pension during the real estate boom years of 2006 and 2007. The real estate bust caused an underfunding of the pension plan of over $300 million. This caused a freeze of its pension plan on February 1, 2009 and an end to 401k match on January 15, 2009. The move was expected to save the company 29 million a year.

The under-funded pension gave the company a negative net worth of -6.88 per share as of November 30, 2009.

GenCorp also is holding $142.80 million in 4% bonds due in 2010 and $147.70 million in bonds due in 2011 that the company expects to have to repurchase, as of the 2008 Annual Report.
"In December 2009, the Company issued $200.0 million in aggregate principal amount of 4.0625% convertible subordinated debentures ("4 1/16% Debentures") in a private placement to qualified institutional buyers under the Securities Act of 1933. Issuance of the 4 1/16% Debentures generated net proceeds of approximately $195.0 million, a portion of which were used to repurchase $124.7 million of the 4% Notes in January 2010. The remaining proceeds will be used to redeem a portion of the 9½% senior subordinated notes ("9½% Notes"); pay accrued interest on the 4% Notes and 9½% Notes; and pay other debt issuance costs."

In March 2010, GenCorp amended a $280 million revolving line of credit.

GenCorp's former CEO J. Scott Neish resigned on January 6, 2010. He had been interim CEO from March 2008 (Terry J Hall resigned) head of the Aerojet division since November 2005. The new CEO was placed in as permanent and J. Scott Neish elected to resign from Aerojet. Scott Seymour had been the head of Northrop Grumman Integrated Systems from 2002 to 2008.

GenCorp since 2008 has had significant changes in its Board of Directors and Corporate Officers, per the 2008 Annual Report:

"On March 5, 2008, Terry L. Hall resigned as a Director and as our Chief Executive Officer and President and
our Board appointed three new Directors. The Board appointed J. Scott Neish, our Vice President and President of
Aerojet, to serve as our interim Chief Executive Officer and President, pending the results of a search to identify
qualified candidates to fill this position on a permanent basis. On May 15, 2008, Timothy A.Wicks, Chairman of the
Board, Todd R. Snyder and Sheila E. Widnall resigned as Directors of the Company. Our Board of Directors
appointed James H. Perry and Thomas A. Corcoran as new Directors on May 16, 2008, and September 25, 2008,
respectively. On September 29, 2008, Yasmin R. Seyal, our former Senior Vice President and Chief Financial
Officer, and R. Leon Blackburn, our former Vice President, Controller left the Company and our Board appointed
Kathleen E. Redd, Vice President, Finance of Aerojet, to serve as our Vice President, Chief Financial Officer and
Secretary."

Nuclear controversy
In 2008, the Government Pension Fund of Norway withdrew its investments in GenCorp due to production of nuclear weapons. As of 2015, there has been no change to this status.

See also
 List of S&P 600 companies

References

External links
 
 

Aerojet aircraft
 
Rocketdyne
Holding companies of the United States
Manufacturing companies based in Greater Los Angeles
Technology companies based in Greater Los Angeles
Companies based in El Segundo, California
American companies established in 1915
Technology companies established in 1915
1915 establishments in Ohio
Companies listed on the New York Stock Exchange
Aerospace companies of the United States
Announced mergers and acquisitions